Rubble stone is rough, uneven building stone not laid in regular courses. It may  fill the core of a wall which is faced with unit masonry such as brick or ashlar. Some medieval cathedral walls have outer shells of ashlar with an inner backfill of mortarless rubble and dirt.

Square rubble masonry
Square rubble masonry consists of stones that are dressed (squared on all joints and beds) before laying, set in mortar, and make up the outer surface of a wall.

History 
Irregular rubble, or sack, masonry evolved from embankments covered with boards, stones or bricks. That outer surface was used to give the embankment greater strength and make it more difficult for enemies to climb. The Sadd el-Khafara dam, in Wadi Al-Garawi near Helwan in Egypt, which is 14 meters high and built in rubble masonry, dates back to 2900 - 2600 BC 
 
The Greeks called the construction technique emplekton and made particular use of it in the construction of the defensive walls of their poleis.

The Romans made extensive use of rubble masonry, calling it opus caementicium, because  caementicium  was the name given to the filling between the two revetments. The technique continued to be used over the centuries, as evidenced by theconstructions of defensive walls and large works during medieval times.

Modern construction frequently uses cast concrete with an internal steel reinforcement. That allows for greater elasticity, as well as providing excellent static and seismic resistance, and preserves the unity between shape and structure typical of buildings with external load-bearing walls. All the structural elements can be linked to any rubble walls thus created, freeing the internal spaces from excessive constraints.

See also 
 Snecked masonry - Masonry made of mixed sizes of stone but in regular courses.
 Wattle and daub - Conceptually analogous to rubble within ashlar in the sense that a frame is filled in with a filler material.

Gallery

References 

Stonemasonry
Building stone